The term "Chicken Maryland" or "Maryland Chicken" refers to a historic dish associated with the U.S. state of Maryland, but has other meanings from other nations. In its home base, the food dish consists of fried chicken served with a cream gravy. It is traditionally garnished with bananas, which were historically one of Baltimore's leading imports.

History and preparation 
Many Maryland families have their own heirloom recipes for this dish, and it remains a regional specialty in Eastern Shore restaurants.
The primary factor that distinguishes Maryland fried chicken from other Southern fried chicken is that rather than cooking the chicken in several inches of oil or shortening, the chicken is pan-fried in a heavy (traditionally cast-iron) skillet and covered tightly after the initial browning so that the chicken steams as well as fries. Milk or cream is then added to the pan juices to create a white cream gravy, another Maryland characteristic.

Escoffier had a recipe for "Chicken à la Maryland" in his landmark cookbook Ma Cuisine.

Australia 
In Australia the term "Chicken Maryland" simply refers to a butcher's cut for a whole leg consisting of the thigh and drumstick.

United Kingdom 

In some Chinese restaurants in the United Kingdom (particularly in Scotland) Chicken Maryland can be found under the "European" or "British" section of the menu. It consists of a breaded, deep fried chicken breast served with a slice of bacon, a banana or pineapple fritter (or both) and chips.

South America 

In Argentina and in some neighboring South American countries, Suprema de Pollo Maryland is a pounded thin breast of chicken, breaded and fried, served with creamed corn, peas, bacon (pancetta), French fries and a fried banana.

See also
List of regional dishes of the United States

References 

British chicken dishes
American chicken dishes
Eastern Shore of Maryland
Maryland cuisine
Fried chicken
Banana dishes
Milk dishes